Demic may refer to:

 Demic diffusion, a demographic term referring to a migratory model
 The Demics, a 1970s Canadian punk rock band
 Larry Demic (born 1957), American basketball player
 Ali Demić (born 1991), Bosnian basketball player

See also